Island Dreams is an instrumental album by roots music band Lost Dogs, released on Fools of the World records in 2005.

Track listing 

All songs written by Taylor, Roe, Daugherty and Hindalong
 "Escape to Paradise"
 "Wikki Tikki"
 "Sailing the Cove"
 "Lovers Lanai"
 "Veranda by the Bay"
 "Rainforest Romance"
 "Sailing the Cove" (reprise)
 "Sleepy Blue Lagoon"
 "Kissed in the Mist"
 "Carnivale"
 "Under the Wave"

Personnel 

Derri Daugherty — guitars, bass, and vocals
Mike Roe — guitars and vocals
Terry Scott Taylor — guitars and vocals

Additional musicians
Christine Glass — vocals
Tim Chandler — bass
Steve Hindalong — percussion, glockenspiel, thumb piano, energy chime
Matt Slocum — cello

Production notes
Recorded and mixed by Derri Daugherty at Neverland Studios, Nashville, Tennessee.
Mastered by Ralph Stover @ Dirtboy, Orangevale, California.
Art Direction by the Lost Dogs.
Design & Layout by Brian Heydn.

Lost Dogs albums
2005 albums
Instrumental albums